Lycomorphodes epatra is a moth of the family Erebidae. It was described by Schaus in 1905. It is found in French Guiana.

References

 Natural History Museum Lepidoptera generic names catalog

Cisthenina
Moths described in 1905